Roberto Colciago (born 4 April 1968) is a racing driver from Saronno, Italy. He has spent most of his career in touring car racing – first in Super Touring and then in Super 2000 – followed by the World Touring Car Championship and currently races in the TCR International series. His major successes include two Swedish Touring Car Championship drivers' titles and the Italian Touring Car Championship title. He is married, with one daughter.

Career history

After a period in karting, Colciago entered the Italian Formula Three Championship at the age of 19. He was classified in 5th position in the 1987 standings, with one race win in his rookie season, and went on to win the title in 1990. From there, he progressed to the FIA Formula 3000 International Championship, but returned to Italian F3 in 1992 and then spent two further seasons in the German F3 Championship.

1995 brought Colciago into touring cars. He participated in the Italian and Spanish Super Touring Championships, with 8th and 10th place classifications respectively. He continued in the Italian series for the next four years and won the privateer's class title in 1996 and 1999. He spent the 2000 and 2001 seasons driving an Audi A4 in the European Super Touring Cup, in which he was a race winner on seven occasions. His 2001 programme was dovetailed with a title-winning participation in the Swedish Touring Car Championship and he successfully defended this title in 2002.

Colciago has spent the last few years switching between Italian and European championships. In 2003, he competed in the European Touring Car Championship, but returned to Italy in 2004, this time in the Touring Master Cup, in which he won two races and finished second in the standings. In 2005, he was back in the ETCC in its new form as the World Touring Car Championship, driving a Honda Accord for independent entrant JAS Motorsport. Then he made another return to Italy for a title-winning season in the Italian Touring Car Championship driving a SEAT. He has since reappeared in the World Championship with SEAT Sport Italia.

Racing record

Complete Italian Touring Car Championship results
(key) (Races in bold indicate pole position) (Races in italics indicate fastest lap)

Complete European Touring Car Championship results
(key) (Races in bold indicate pole position) (Races in italics indicate fastest lap)

† — Did not finish the race, but was classified as he completed over 90% of the race distance.

Complete World Touring Car Championship results
(key) (Races in bold indicate pole position) (Races in italics indicate fastest lap)

Complete TCR International Series results
(key) (Races in bold indicate pole position) (Races in italics indicate fastest lap)

References
Driver Profile From fiawtcc.com. Retrieved 10 September 2007.

1968 births
Living people
People from Saronno
Italian racing drivers
Italian Formula Three Championship drivers
German Formula Three Championship drivers
Swedish Touring Car Championship drivers
World Touring Car Championship drivers
International Formula 3000 drivers
European Touring Car Championship drivers
Sportspeople from the Province of Varese
Karting World Championship drivers
BMW M drivers
RC Motorsport drivers
Prema Powerteam drivers
Cupra Racing drivers